Oligo may refer to:

Oligomer, as an abbreviation for the general term, or specifically for oligonucleotide, oligopeptide, oligosaccharide, or oligoester.
OLIGO Primer Analysis Software
Oligo- as a prefix, meaning "few"